California's 33rd State Assembly district is one of 80 California State Assembly districts. It is currently represented by Republican Devon Mathis.

District profile 

The district, one of the largest in California, encompasses a wide expanse of the High Desert, stretching from the Victor Valley to the Nevada and Arizona borders. It also includes several communities in the San Bernardino Mountains. The district's population is mostly concentrated in the southwest, with scattered settlements elsewhere. 

San Bernardino County – 23.1%
 Adelanto
 Apple Valley
 Baker
 Barstow
 Big Bear City
 Big Bear Lake
 Big River
 Crestline
 Helendale
 Hesperia
 Lake Arrowhead
 Lenwood
 Lucerne Valley
 Needles
 Phelan – partial
 Running Springs
 Trona
 Victorville

Election results from statewide races

List of Assembly Members 
Due to redistricting, the 33rd district has been moved around different parts of the state. The current iteration resulted from the 2011 redistricting by the California Citizens Redistricting Commission.

Election results 1992 - present

2020

2018

2016

2014

2012

2010

2008

2006

2004

2002

2000

1998

1996

1994

1992

See also 
 California State Assembly
 California State Assembly districts
 Districts in California

References

External links 
 District map from the California Citizens Redistricting Commission

33
Government of San Bernardino County, California
Big Bear Valley
Mojave Desert
San Bernardino Mountains
Searles Valley
Victor Valley
Barstow, California
Hesperia, California
Needles, California
Victorville, California